The University of South Australia Student Association (USASA), provides democratic student representation and services including advocacy, student clubs, second-hand books, social events, and a student magazine to the students of the University of South Australia (UniSA). USASA is spread across the University of South Australia's four metropolitan campuses as well as the Centre for Regional Engagement, encompassing the Whyalla and Mount Gambier campuses.

History
On  January 1, 1991, the University of South Australia was established as a result of a merger between the Institute of Technology and significant elements of the South Australian College of Advanced Education. This merger necessitated the formation of a single student association that represented the needs of the then six campuses of the newly formed university. The New University Merger Discussion Group was the beginning of the UniSA Students Association (USASA). USASA was inaugurated in 1994, with the Confederated Student Union, the South Australian Institute of Technology Union and the Council of South Australian College Student Organisations managing the intervening years.

When the Howard Government introduced Voluntary Student Unionism (VSU) in 2006, USASA had to restructure to cope with loss of income. Part of this restructure included rebranding the University of South Australia's student association as 'UniLife'.

In 2013, a referendum of students overwhelmingly voted to officially rebrand the organisation as the 'University of South Australia Student Association'. This marked a time of restructure and renewed focus on student representation.

Structure
USASA is a democratic organisation run by students that is responsive to student needs. USASA provides opportunities for students to become involved in the decision-making process at the central level and their local campus level through branch committees. USASA has established a number of standing committees that deal with specific areas of student concern. These standing committees include the Education Standing Committee, the Equity and Welfare Standing Committee, and the Services Standing Committee.

USASA Board
The overarching policies of the student association are set by the USASA Board. This is composed of students elected by and from the student population. The composition of the USASA Board and its powers and responsibilities are set out in the USASA Constitution.

Staff
USASA employs over 15 permanent, temporary and casual staff. Representation and student service delivery provided by USASA is coordinated from the City West Campus head office and assisted by campus counters on each metropolitan campus. USASA employees perform a range of roles and either directly provide student services or support student representatives and club organisers to carry out their roles.

Student Services

USASA's main objectives are to be an effective voice for representing students, ensure that students receive support regarding their rights and responsibilities and understand University policies and procedures and 
contribute to a campus culture where students have fun, make friends and take pride in their University.

Academic Advocacy
USASA Advocates provide free and confidential advice on a wide range of academic problems. Common issues advocates assist with include requests for remarking/re-submissions, appeals against allegations of academic misconduct, appeals against final grades, appeals against intention to preclude, issues with lecturers and more.

Second-hand Textbooks
USASA's second hand textbook service sells books on behalf of students. Books are accepted on a consignment basis.  When a book is bought or sold with the service, the book and the money directly goes to, or comes from, another student.

Student Clubs
USASA supports over 90 social, special interest, cultural and academic clubs. USASA pays homage to club activities throughout the year by holding the USASA Awards Night.

Campus Counters
USASA Campus Counters are located on all four metropolitan campuses and are run by student staff. Counters offer freebies (such as diaries, wall planners, pens & lollies), sanitary items, and info about USASA services and events.

Social Events
USASA holds a variety of student events throughout the year, including UniTopia (a stress-less event involving a petting zoo, massages, snacks, arts and crafts + more), ClubsFest, O-Week events and art competitions. Events change from year-to-year, but all engage to increase student engagement on campus.

Club and Leadership Grants
The USASA grant programs aim to support initiatives that enhance the student experience. Successful initiatives provide opportunities for students to develop the non-academic (or extra-curricular) student experience through:
• Enhancing campus vibrancy
• Supporting clubs and societies to run original and engaging events
• Supporting innovative personal development programs

Student Bar
UniSA purchased the "Rapture" nightclub building situated at 58-60 North Terrace to be refurbished into a student lounge in 2009. This was opened for casual student use in Study Period 2, 2009. Notable events held at the venue included the National Campus Band Comp, National Campus Art Prize Finals Exhibition and an exclusive Sundance Kids gig organised by UniSA CareerShop.

Over the summer of 2011–12, the UniSA student lounge underwent major renovations to become an official Adelaide Fringe 2012 venue called "The Grand Academy of Lagado". The Grand Opening Party on 24 February 2012 attracted over 1700 patrons with live music, art, cabaret and comedy events spanning the 3-week Fringe period.

During the 2012-13 study break the university failed to renew the lease of the student bar and now directly controls operations. This takeover caused another name change and the bar is currently called 'West Bar' and is not open to the public.

Student Media

Verse Magazine
Verse Magazine is a student-run magazine, published six times a year and distributed around UniSA campuses. The magazine content is entirely student created featuring articles, stories, poems, illustration, photographs submitted to the student editors. Regular features include interviews with graduates, Vox Pop, feature of a UniSA art student's work, movie and music reviews. The magazine maintains a website which features content from the magazine and also online exclusive articles. In 2017, Verse Magazine won the 'Best Student Publication' award at Tertiary Access Group's CampusLink Awards in Canberra

UniLife Magazine

The UniLife Magazine was a student-run magazine published eight times a year and distributed at all UniSA campuses. UniLife Magazine covered the latest student-relevant events, photos, interviews, reviews and stories. Any UniSA student could contribute to the UniLife Magazine. The publication was run by a team of editors working out of the UniLife Magazine office at UniSA Magill Campus. At the beginning of 2014 Unilife Magazine became USASA magazine to coincide with the re-branding of the organisation. USASA magazine existed under this name until a review of the magazine mid-2014 saw the magazine re-branded, refreshed and relaunched as Verse Magazine.

Entropy Magazine
Entropy Magazine was a spin-off project started by the UniSA student association to promote youth culture in 1992. The design driven magazine proved to be an effective means of discovering new creative talent within the fields of design, art, illustration, photography and writing.

In 2004, Entropy beat 26 other student magazines from Australia and New Zealand to win the ACUMA "Best Student Magazine Award".

The Greenpeace Design Awards was a poster design award in 2009, presented by Greenpeace Australia Pacific and UniLife Inc, in association with the University of South Australia. The aim of the competition was to motivate creative communities around the world to create artwork that encourages the public to take action on environmental issues and support Greenpeace. This need for a call to action message was stimulated through the poster brief "Be Part of the Action". The Greenpeace Design Awards proved an international success, garnering 1500 entries from 77 different countries. Melbourne designer Sam Dickson won the inaugural competition, with Denis Popenkov from Russia and Spencer Harrison taking second and third place respectively.

March 2009 signalled the rebranding of Entropy Magazine as UniLife Magazine to ensure that the student publication more greatly represented UniSA student interests.

References

Students' unions in Australia
Student politics in Australia
University of South Australia